John Francis Buckland (1825–1910) was an auctioneer and a Member of the Legislative Assembly of Queensland.

Private life

John Francis Buckland was born in Runnymede, Wraysbury, England in 1832 in a farmhouse that was a former hunting lodge of King John. He immigrated to Queensland in 1862 from England.

His wife was Ellen Gertrude Ashton, daughter of Joseph Ashton and Mary Hewison.

Buckland died on 21 September 1910 and was buried on 22 September 1910 in Nundah Cemetery. He was survived by his wife, who died 8 October 1911.

Business life

On arrival in Queensland in 1862, he established an auctioneering partnership with Simon Fraser (Fraser & Buckland, 1863–1873). His uncle, William Thomas Buckland, was an auctioneer in Windsor, England. Later he was in business on his own account as an auctioneer and broker.

Public life
Buckland was a member of the Toombul Shire Council and its chairman from 1883 to 1885.

On 13 July 1882, he was elected through a by-election as Member of the Legislative Assembly of Queensland representing Bulimba. He was re-elected in 1883 and 1888, and resigned on 29 March 1892 in order to attend to his own financial affairs during an economic depression.

References

1825 births
1910 deaths
Members of the Queensland Legislative Assembly
Australian auctioneers
Burials at Nundah Cemetery
19th-century Australian businesspeople